Lincoln City Career Technical High School is a charter high school in Lincoln City, Oregon, United States. It was created as a charter school in 2000. It was recently ranked by U.S. News & World Report as the second-best school in the district overall. It has a class size of 2–8, a student-teacher ratio of 5 to 1, and an academic faculty well versed in math, science, English, and social sciences. 

The school is based on work-based education, courses developed through project-based learning, integrating an advanced hybrid learning system developed by the Gates Foundation utilizing onsite tutors/instructors assisted with an online academic instructional platform. The emphasis of day-day operations includes the school as a simulated workplace, with emphasis on job-finding, skill development, and engagement in higher-paying jobs in the workplace. The school has been accredited by the Northwest Association of Accredited Schools since 1996.

Academics
In 2019, Career Tech had 54 students and 11 staff for a 5:1 student to teacher ratio.

References

Alternative schools in Oregon
High schools in Lincoln County, Oregon
Public high schools in Oregon
Charter schools in Oregon